Miloš Říha (6 December 1958 – 31 August 2020) was a Czech ice hockey player and coach, who coached the Czech national team at the 2019 IIHF World Championship.

References

External links

1958 births
2020 deaths
Czech expatriate ice hockey people
Czech expatriate sportspeople in Russia
Czech expatriate sportspeople in Slovakia
Czech ice hockey coaches
Czech ice hockey forwards
Czech Republic men's national ice hockey team coaches
HC Dukla Jihlava players
SHK Hodonín players
HC Kometa Brno players
HC ZUBR Přerov players
Sportspeople from Přerov
HC Vítkovice players
PSG Berani Zlín players
Minnesota North Stars draft picks